Saint (or St) Johnstown, Johnstoun, Johnston or Johnstone may refer to:

Ireland
 St Johnston, County Donegal
 St Johnstown (County Donegal) (Parliament of Ireland constituency)
 Saint Johnstown or Ballinalee, County Longford
 St Johnstown (County Longford) (Parliament of Ireland constituency)

Scotland
 Perth, Scotland, originally known as Saint John's Toun or St Johnstone
 St Johnstone F.C., based in Perth

United States
 Saint Johnstown, Delaware, a stop on the now defunct Queen Anne's Railroad line between Ellendale and Greenwood

See also
 Johnston (disambiguation)
 Johnstown (disambiguation)
 Saint John (disambiguation)
 Saint John's (disambiguation)